Manfred von Richthofen (1892 – 1918), known famously as the Red Baron, was a German fighter pilot during World War I.

Red Baron may also refer to:

People 
 Éric Barone (born 1960), French sportsman and world record cyclist
 Robert Ludvigovich Bartini (1897–1974), also known as Roberto Oros di Bartini, Italian aircraft designer and scientist
 Red Berenson, head hockey coach at University of Michigan (1984–2017) and former NHL player (1967–1978)
 Erik Palmstierna (1877–1959), Swedish baron and Social democratic politician
 Michael Schumacher (born 1969), German Formula One motor racing champion
 Rick Sutcliffe (born 1956), American former professional baseball pitcher
 Harrison Farrow (born 2000), Shipping Mogul

Arts and entertainment

Fictional characters
 Red Baron, an unseen antagonist of the dog Snoopy in the Peanuts comic strip by Charles M. Schulz
 Red Baron, a character controlled by the first player in Namco's 1985 arcade game Sky Kid

Film and television 
 Von Richthofen and Brown or The Red Baron, a 1971 war film by Roger Corman
 The Red Baron (1972 film), a 1972 animated made-for-TV film produced by Rankin/Bass Productions; originally aired on The ABC Saturday Superstar Movie
 Super Robot Red Baron, a 1973 Japanese tokusatsu television series
 Red Baron (anime), a 1994 Japanese anime television series based on Super Robot Red Baron
 The Red Baron (2008 film), a German film about Manfred von Richthofen

Games 
 Red Baron (1980 video game), an arcade game by Atari
 Red Baron (1990 video game), a PC combat flight simulator by Dynamix

Music
 "Snoopy vs. the Red Baron" (song), a 1966 novelty song
 Red Baron Records, a jazz record label
 The Red Baron (band), an American Christian and straight edge band
 "Red Baron", a song by Billy Cobham from Spectrum
 "The Red Baron", a song by Game Theory from Distortion
 "The Red Baron", a song by Sabaton from the album The Great War
 "Red Baron/Blue Max", a song by Iced Earth from the album The Glorious Burden

Sports teams
 Scranton/Wilkes-Barre Red Barons (1989–2006), a former minor league affiliate of the Philadelphia Phillies in Scranton, Pennsylvania
 Red Barons Cologne (1982–1991), an American football club in Cologne, Germany

Vehicles and aeronautics
 N104RB Red Baron, a privately owned F104 jet which set a world speed record
 Project Red Baron, a United States Air Force study into air-to-air combat during the Vietnam War
 RB51 Red Baron, an Unlimited World Champion racing aircraft which set a world speed record
 The Red Baron (custom car), a custom t-bucket hot rod built in 1969
 Red Baron Squadron (1979–2007), an aerobatics team sponsored by Red Baron frozen pizza

Other uses
 Red Baron (ride), an amusement park ride
 Red Baron, a common street name of dextromethorphan
 Red Baron, a species of dragonfly in the genus Urothemis
 Red Baron, an American brand of frozen pizza sold by Schwan's Company
 Red Baron, a nickname for the invasive grass seed Imperata cylindrica

See also
 Barão Vermelho, a Brazilian rock band
 Barón Rojo, a Spanish hard rock/heavy metal band
 Black Baron (disambiguation)